Play Me Out is the thirteenth studio album by Australian-American pop singer Helen Reddy that was released in 1981 by MCA Records. Having recorded 12 studio albums at Capitol Records over a 10-year period, she felt the move was "'long overdue... For the last three years I didn't feel I was getting the support from them.'" Whatever support she received from the new label was not enough to get the album onto Billboard magazine's Top LPs & Tape chart.



Single

The album includes the song that was her last to reach Billboard's Hot 100 and Adult Contemporary charts.  "I Can't Say Goodbye to You" made its pop chart debut in the issue of the magazine dated May 23, 1981, and peaked at number 88 during its three weeks there. That same issue also marked its first appearance on the Adult Contemporary chart, where it spent four weeks and got as high as number 42. It also reached number 43 on the UK singles chart.

The album's producer, Joel Diamond, had helmed a recording of "Save Me" by Donna McDaniel in 1977 that got as high as number 90 on the Hot 100, but MCA did not release Reddy's cover from this album as a single. Country artist Louise Mandrell did, however, have a number six Country hit with it two years after the release of this album, in 1983.

Track listing

Side 1
 "Optimism Blues" (Allen Toussaint) – 3:10
 "Do It Like You Done It When You Meant It" (Howard Greenfield, Neil Sedaka) – 3:28
 "I Can't Say Goodbye to You" (Becky Hobbs) – 3:46
 "Save Me" (Guy Fletcher, Doug Flett) – 3:10
 "You Don't Have To Say You Love Me" (Pino Donaggio, Simon Napier-Bell, Vicki Wickham) – 2:43
Side 2
 "The Stars Fell on California" (Johnny Bristol) – 3:54
 "I Don't Know Why (I Love That Guy)" (Becky Hobbs) – 2:35
 "When I Dream" (Sandy Mason) – 3:54
 "Let's Just Stay Home Tonight" (Lotti Golden, Richard Scher) – 3:09
 "Play Me Out" (Lesley Gore, Carol Hall) – 3:07

Personnel
Helen Reddy – vocals
Joel Diamond – producer; rhythm track arranger; arranger and conductor for strings, horns and background vocals ("Play Me Out")
Artie Butler – arranger and conductor for strings, horns and background vocals ("I Can't Say Goodbye to You", "Save Me")
Charles Calello – arranger and conductor for strings, horns and background vocals ("Optimism Blues", "You Don’t Have to Say You Love Me", "I Don't Know Why (I Love That Guy)", "Let's Just Stay Home Tonight")
Gene Page – arranger and conductor for strings, horns and background vocals ("Do It Like You Done It When You Meant It", "The Stars Fell on California", "When I Dream")
Bill Halverson – recording engineer
Russell Schmitt – assistant engineer
Doug Kirkland – photography
George Osaki – art direction 
Michael Kevin Lee – graphics
Jeff Wald – management
Denise Maynelli – background vocals
Marti McCall – background vocals
Myrna Matthews – background vocals
Julia Waters Tillman – background vocals
Maxine Waters Willard – background vocals
Clydene Jackson – background vocals
Oren Waters – background vocals
Luther Waters – background vocals
 Rhythm Players

John Guerin – drums
Gary Coleman – percussion
Robben Ford – guitar
Thom Rotella – guitar 
Waddy Wachtel – guitar
Timothy May – guitar
Larry Klein – bass

John Barnes – keyboards
Ron Fever – keyboards
Eddie "Bongo" Brown – conga and bongos
Jim Horn – sax solo ("Let's Just Stay Home Tonight")
Ernie Watts – sax solo ("The Stars Fell on California")
Rick Baptist – trumpet solo ("Play Me Out")
Helen Reddy and Rhythm Section – tambourine and hand claps ("Play Me Out")

recorded at Devonshire Sound Studios, Los Angeles, California

Notes

References

 

1981 albums
MCA Records albums
Helen Reddy albums
Albums arranged by Gene Page
Albums arranged by Charles Calello